Biju Expressway is a State Highway in the state of Odisha,  with a total length of 650 km. It starts at Chandili (border village in Koraput district) and goes on to touch border towns/market centres such as Kotpad, Boriguma, Nabarangpur, Papadahandi, Ambapani, Godbhanja, Dharmagarh, Sinapalli, Bhella, Nuapada, Paikamal, Padampur, Sohela, Sambalpur, Jharsuguda, Sundargarh before ending at Rourkela. The main expressway is between Vedvyas and Sambalpur. The Biju Expressway contains three toll gates. The first one is 6 km before Rajgangpur Bypass.The second tollgate is at Masunikani and the third gate is at Rengali. The maximum capable speed limit of L&T SRTL (Larsen & Toubro Sambalpur Rourkela Tollway Limited) is 160 km/h between the 163km stretch from Vedvyas to Rengali.

Importants Landmarks 
SH-10, Biju Expressway (ବିଜୁ ଏକ୍ସପ୍ରେସୱେ)
Vedvyas (ବେଦବ୍ୟାସ)
Kansbahal (କାଂଶବାହାଲ)
Kutra (କୁତ୍ରା)
Tudalaga (ତୁଡାଲଗା)
Bargaon (ବଡ଼ଗାଁ)
Jarangloi (ଜରଙ୍ଗଲୋଇ)
Karamdihi (କରମଡ଼଼ିହି)
Sundargarh (ସୁନ୍ଦରଗଡ)
Kirei (କିରେଇ)
Jharsuguda Bypass (ଝାରସୁଗୁଡା ବାଇପାସ)
Badmal (ବଡ଼ମାଲ)
Rengali (ରେଙ୍ଗାଲି)
Ainthapali Sambalpur (ଅଇଁଠାପାଲି ସମ୍ବଲପୁର)

The total cost of the project is around ₹3,630 crore. The project will be completed in phased manner, in the first phase of the project, a 254km four-lane road will be established by converting an existing road and a further 402km will be converted into a two-lane road. In the second phase, 258km of road will be converted into four lanes.

The first phase of the project is scheduled to be completed by Dec 2017, and the second phase is set to be completed by the end of 2019. Once completed, it will reduce the travel time between the two cities from 13 hrs to 6 hrs.

307 km of the total length would be converted into the four lane standard while the National Highways Authority of India (NHAI) will further develop another 183 km. The 160-km road from Rourkela to Sambalpur (SH-10) will be converted into four lanes through Public Private Partnership (PPP).

Status updates

Status updates of the 656 km long under construction Biju Expressway. The road will connect Rourkela to Chandili via Sambalpur, Nuapada, out of which the 355 km long Rourkela-Sambalpur-Nuapada section will be 4 lanes wide and the remaining 301km Nuapada-Chandili section will be 2 lanes wide.

 June 2017: Road from Rourkela to Sambalpur to be completed by December 2017. All sections to be completed by June 2019.
 March 2018: The 163 km long four-lane expressway from Rourkela to Sambalpur was inaugurated by Chief Minister Naveen Patnaik.
 March 2019: 70% of the total work completed.

Gallery

References

Expressways in Odisha
Transport in Rourkela
Transport in Odisha